Sue Cogswell (born 7 September 1951 in Birmingham) is a retired squash player from England. She was runner-up at the 1979 Women's World Open Squash Championship, where she lost in the final to the Australian player Heather McKay 6–9, 9–3, 9–1, 9–4. Cogswell was also a three-time runner-up at the British Open, losing in the final to McKay in 1974, to Barbara Wall in 1979, and to Vicki Cardwell in 1980. Cogswell won the British National Squash Championship title five times in 1975 and 1977–79.

Cogswell was part of the winning British team during the 1979 Women's World Team Squash Championships and runner-up in the 1981 Women's World Team Squash Championships.

References

External links
 

1951 births
Living people
English female squash players